San Martín de Porres is a Mexican telenovela produced by Televisa for Telesistema Mexicano in 1964. Based on the life of San Martín de Porres.

Cast 
Magda Guzmán
René Muñoz
Josefina Escobedo
Jorge del Campo

References

External links 

Mexican telenovelas
1964 telenovelas
Televisa telenovelas
1964 Mexican television series debuts
1964 Mexican television series endings
Spanish-language telenovelas